The France–Italy football rivalry is a football rivalry between the national football teams of Italy and France, having achieved six FIFA World Cups and four UEFA European Championships between the two countries. Italy has won four FIFA World Cups in 1934, 1938, 1982 and 2006, while France has won two FIFA World Cups in 1998 and 2018.

For many years Italy dominated (before 1982: 17 wins, three losses and six draws), while from 1982 the French team had not lost a single game against Italy (with five wins and four draws) until the 2006 World Cup Final, which Italy won 5–3 on penalties after a 1–1 draw.

The two countries also met in the final of the 2000 European Championship, won by France with an extra-time golden goal by David Trezeguet.

List of matches

 (a) First international match ever for Italy
 (b) Italy wins the quarter-final and later wins the 1938 World Cup
 (c) France advances in the quarter-final after penalty shoot-out (4–3) and later wins the 1998 World Cup
 (d) France wins the 2000 European Championship after a Golden goal in extra time by David Trezeguet
 (e) Italy wins the 2006 World Cup after penalty shoot-out (5–3)

Comparison of France's and Italy's positions in major international tournaments
 Key
 Denotes which team finished better in that particular competition.
DNQ: Did not qualify.
DNP: Did not participate.
TBD: To be determined.

Major encounters

1938 FIFA World Cup
On 12 June, France and Italy were matched up in the quarter final of the 1938 FIFA World Cup, which ended 3–1 in favour of Italy with goals by Gino Colaussi in the 9th minute and two goals by Silvio Piola in the 51st and 72nd minute, with France's only goal coming from Oscar Heisserer in the 10th minute, as France were eliminated. Italy went on to win their second World Cup title in succession.

1978 FIFA World Cup
On 2 June, Italy and France met in the first group stage match of the 1978 FIFA World Cup, which ended 2–1 for Italy after goals by Paolo Rossi in the 29th minute and Renato Zaccarelli in the 54th minute, although France scored first in the 1st minute of play with a goal by Bernard Lacombe. Italy later made it out of the group, but France did not.

1986 FIFA World Cup
On 17 June, Italy and France met in the round of 16 of the 1986 FIFA World Cup, which ended with France eliminating Italy from the tournament 2–0 with goals by Michel Platini in the 15th minute and Yannick Stopyra in the 57th minute.

1998 FIFA World Cup
On 3 July, Italy and France were matched up for a quarter-final of the 1998 FIFA World Cup, which ended in a goalless draw after 120 minutes. In the shoot-out, France won 4–3 to advance and went on to win the 1998 World Cup 3–0 over Brazil.

UEFA Euro 2000

On 2 July, Marco Delvecchio gave Italy the lead in the 55th minute and they held on until the final minute of injury time, when Sylvain Wiltord crashed a low drive past Italian keeper Francesco Toldo to take the game into extra time.
France won the game just before half-time in extra-time when Robert Pires cut the ball back for David Trezeguet to blast the golden goal into the top left corner of the net to win the tournament 2–1 for France.

2006 FIFA World Cup

On 9 July, France and Italy faced off in the final. Zinedine Zidane opened the scoring by converting a controversial 7th-minute penalty kick, conceded by Marco Materazzi, which glanced off the underside of the crossbar and into the goal. Materazzi then levelled the scores in the 19th minute, a header from six yards following an Andrea Pirlo corner from the right. Both teams had chances to score the winning goal in normal time: Luca Toni hit the crossbar in the 35th minute for Italy, later having a header disallowed for offside, while France were not granted a possible second penalty in the 53rd minute when Florent Malouda went down in the box after a cover tackle from Gianluca Zambrotta. France appeared to be the side with better chances to win because of the higher number of shots on goal. They were unable to capitalise, however, and the score remained at one goal each.

At the end of the regulation time, the score was still level at 1–1, and the match was forced into extra time. Italian keeper Gianluigi Buffon made a potentially game-saving save in extra time when he tipped a Zidane header over the crossbar.

Almost five minutes into the second half of extra time, Zidane and Materazzi were jogging up the pitch close to each other, they briefly exchanged words after Materazzi was seen tugging at Zidane's jersey before Zidane began to walk away from him. Moments later, Zidane suddenly stopped, turned around and head-butted Materazzi's chest, knocking him to the ground. Although play was halted, referee Horacio Elizondo did not appear to have seen the confrontation. According to match officials' reports, fourth official Luis Medina Cantalejo informed Elizondo of the incident through his headset. After consulting his assistants, Elizondo issued Zidane a red card in the 110th minute.

Despite Italy being one man up for the last ten minutes of extra time, no team managed to score and remained 1–1, as the match went to penalty shoot-out.

The French David Trezeguet was the only player to miss his penalty kick as it hit the crossbar and the ball did not cross the goal line, while Fabio Grosso scored the winner for Italy as the Italians won the shoot-out 5–3.

After the match, Zidane was given the Golden Ball award as the tournament's best player. Fabio Cannavaro and Andrea Pirlo, both from Italy, placed second and third respectively.

UEFA Euro 2008
Italy and France met in the final group stage match of UEFA Euro 2008 on 17 June. Both sides needed a win to progress to the next round, but both would be eliminated no matter what if Romania defeated the Netherlands in the other match. Italian goals by Andrea Pirlo from the penalty spot in the 25th minute and Daniele De Rossi in the 62nd minute gave Italy a 2–0 win over France, which allowed them to progress to the quarter final (as Romania lost to the Netherlands), while France was eliminated.

Statistics

Overall

Note: *France defeated Italy in a 1998 World Cup quarter-final match via penalty shoot-out; Italy defeated France in the 2006 FIFA World Cup Final via penalty shoot-out.

Official titles comparison

Note: Only the Olympic Games from 1908 to 1956 are officially recognized by FIFA / IFFHS.

See also
 Football derbies in France
 Football derbies in Italy
 France–Italy relations
 Croatia–Italy football rivalry

References

External links

 
France national football team rivalries
Italy national football team rivalries
International association football rivalries
France at the 1938 FIFA World Cup
France at the 1978 FIFA World Cup
France at the 1986 FIFA World Cup
France at the 1998 FIFA World Cup
France at UEFA Euro 2000
France at the 2006 FIFA World Cup
France at UEFA Euro 2008
Italy at the 1938 FIFA World Cup
Italy at the 1978 FIFA World Cup
Italy at the 1986 FIFA World Cup
Italy at the 1998 FIFA World Cup
Italy at UEFA Euro 2000
Italy at the 2006 FIFA World Cup
Italy at UEFA Euro 2008